Arapoti is a municipality in the state of Paraná in Brazil served by Avelino Vieira Airport.  As of 2020, the estimated population was 28,300.

See also
Saint Nicholas Garden Canyon

References